Caroline Buchanan (born 24 October 1990) is an Australian cyclist who has won multiple world championships in BMX and mountain biking. She represented Australia at the 2012 and 2016 Summer Olympics in the women's BMX event.

Personal
Nicknamed Caro, Buchanan was born on 24 October 1990 in Canberra, Australia. She attended Duffy Primary School before going to high school at Merici College and Erindale College. In September 2016, Buchanan became engaged to American BMX rider Barry Nobles and they married in September 2018.

In late December, 2017, Buchanan was involved in an off-road vehicle accident. She suffered serious injuries, including a collapsed lung and spent time in an intensive care unit.

Cycling
Buchanan represents Australia in BMX and mountain biking. She has been coached by Wade Bootes since 2007. Her primary training base is on Queensland's Gold Coast. She has a cycling scholarship with the ACT Academy of Sport. She is a member of the Tuggeranong Vikings BMX Club. She is 11× time Australian champion in BMX, in 2011 World Championships Buchanan won silver medal at time trial. She is also the 2009 and 2010 4-X Champion. She has earned the Australian Female Mountain bike rider of the year title three times.

While Buchanan was one of the best Australian BMX riders in 2008, she was not eligible for the Olympics because of her age. Following the 2008 issue, she added mountain biking to her cycling disciplines.

During 2012, Buchanan was focused on BMX and earning an Olympic spot in the discipline. In 2012, she won a round of the Supercross, becoming the first Australian woman to do so. She had the two fastest runs at the 2012 time trial event at the World Championships in Birmingham, England. In May 2012, she was ranked the number one women's BMX rider in the world. She was selected to represent Australia at the 2012 Summer Olympics in the women's BMX event.

In September 2013 Buchanan won the elite women's title at the UCI World Four Cross Championships in Leogang, Austria. She beat Anneke Beerten (Netherlands) the defending world champion. In July Buchanan also won the UCI BMX World Championships in New Zealand. In 2013, she won the Sir Hubert Opperman Trophy for Australia's best all-round cyclist. She was the first person competing in BMX or mountain bike to win the award.

In May 2016 Buchanan won the Elite Women's Time Trial at the World BMX Championships in Colombia and was second to Mariana Pajon in the Elite Women's BMX race.

Buchanan qualified second in the seeding at the 2016 Olympics. However, she crashed during one of the semi-final rounds and didn't qualify for the final.

Since recovering from an accident in December 2017 she has started to compete in freestyle BMX events. In October 2019 she joined the Ride Concepts team. She is aiming to compete in BMX in the 2020 Tokyo Olympics.

Results

2009
 1st  UCI Four Cross World Championship
2010
 1st  UCI Four Cross World Championship
 2nd BMX World Cup
2011
 2nd Elite Time Trial BMX World Championships
2012 
 1st  Elite Time Trial BMX World Championships
 1st BMX World Cup
 5th London Olympics BMX
2013
 1st  UCI Four Cross World Championship
 1st Elite  BMX World Championships
 3rd Elite Time Trial BMX World Championships
2014
 1st BMX World Cup 
 1st  Elite National Championships
 2nd Elite time trial BMX World Championships
2015
 1st  Elite National Championships
 2nd Elite Oceania Championships
 2nd Elite BMX World Championships
2016
 1st  UCI Four Cross World Championship
 1st  Elite Time Trial BMX World Championships 
 2nd Elite BMX World Championships 
 2nd Elite Oceania Championships
 Semi-finals Rio de Janeiro Olympics BMX
2017
 1st  UCI Four Cross World Championship
 1st  Elite National Championships
 2nd Elite BMX World Championships 
2019
 1st General Classification Banyuwangi International BMX

References

External links
 
 
 
 
 
 

1990 births
Living people
Four-cross mountain bikers
Australian female cyclists
BMX riders
Olympic cyclists of Australia
Cyclists at the 2012 Summer Olympics
Cyclists at the 2016 Summer Olympics
UCI BMX World Champions (elite women)
UCI Mountain Bike World Champions (women)
ACT Academy of Sport alumni